Esteban de Jesús (August 2, 1950 – May 11, 1989) was a Puerto Rican world lightweight champion boxer. De Jesús, a native of the town of Carolina, Puerto Rico, was a gymmate of Wilfred Benítez and was trained by Benitez's father, Gregorio Benitez. He was the first boxer to defeat Roberto Durán as a pro, and the only fighter to defeat Duran during his lightweight reign. His career was mired in controversy, problems, and scandals.

Professional career 

De Jesús debuted as a professional in 1969, beating El Tarita by a knockout in round three in San Juan. He won his first twenty fights, thirteen by knockout and then stepped up in class, for the first time, when he boxed future world title challenger Josue Marquez in 1971, beating him in a twelve-round decision to claim the Puerto Rican national Lightweight championship.. His next fight was a fourth-round knockout victory over Victor Ortíz. After that, there was a rematch with Marquez, who was beaten again, also over twelve rounds, to retain the Puerto Rican Lightweight title.

Next came his first international fight, in Caracas, Venezuela, against the future four-time world title challenger Leonel Hernandez. De Jesús won the ten round fight by unanimous decision in what was the start of a four fight tour of Venezuela. That Venezuelan campaign ended with a ten-round decision loss against former world champion Antonio Gomez in Caracas.

1972 was a pivotal year in de Jesús' career. He won six fights in a row, including a twelve-round knockout win in a third fight with Marquez to again retain the Puerto Rican Lightweight title, and a ten-round decision over Doug McClendon. Despite all the wins, he was virtually unknown to most boxing fans. That changed quickly in his last fight of 1972 against the undefeated new world's Lightweight champion Roberto Durán at the Madison Square Garden arena. In a televised bout that marked the beginning of the "Durán - de Jesús trilogy", de Jesús dropped Durán in round one and went on to inflict Durán's first defeat in a ten-round decision.

In 1973, he was rewarded for his efforts, receiving a chance to challenge Ray Lampkin for the North American Boxing Federation lightweight belt. He won the vacant title by beating Lampkin in a twelve-round decision. He went on to beat Johnny Gant and Raul Montoya in ten-round decisions and beat Lampkin by decision in a rematch in New York. He finished 1973 with a first-round knockout win over fringe contender Al Foster.

He began 1974 by knocking out former world Jr. Welterweight champion Alfonso "Peppermint" Frazer in ten rounds in San Juan, Puerto Rico, after which he traveled to Panama City to receive his first world title shot and, at the same time, face Durán in the second fight of their trilogy. He once again dropped Durán in round one, but this time Durán rebounded and dominated the bout, retaining the title in an eleventh-round knockout. He recovered from that defeat with two more wins before the end of the year.

In 1975, he went up in weight briefly, and after beating Jesse Lara by a knockout in three, he returned to Panama City to challenge Colombia's Antonio Cervantes for the world's Jr. Welterweight title, losing in a fifteen-round decision. He beat Rudy Barros by knockout in round five to end that year, and started 1976 by beating Valentin Ramos by knockout in round two.

Next came his third world title try when the WBC's world Lightweight champion Ishimatsu Suzuki of Japan traveled to Puerto Rico to defend his title against de Jesús. The third time proved to be the charm for de Jesús, who won the world title by beating Suzuki in a fifteen-round decision. He retained the title against Hector Medina with a knockout in round seven.

De Jesús admitted publicly to using drugs during his boxing career. He began using cocaine and heroin early in his boxing career with an older brother, Enrique.

In 1977, he retained the title against Buzzsaw Yamabe by knockout in round six and against Vicente Mijares Saldivar by knockout in round eleven.

1978 began with the third and final chapter of his trilogy with Durán. In a title unification bout in Las Vegas, which displayed Durán at the peak of his power, Durán systematically broke down de Jesús resulting in a twelfth-round knockout.

De Jesús rebounded with three wins before the end of that year, including one over former world title challenger Edwin Viruet.

In 1979, he had two more wins, including one over Jimmy Blevins. After beating José Vallejo by a knockout in round seven in San Juan to start 1980, he traveled to Bloomington, Minnesota, to challenge Saoul Mamby for Mamby's WBC world Jr. Welterweight title, in the major supporting event of the Larry Holmes-Scott Le Doux world heavyweight championship bout's undercard. In what turned out to be his last fight, he was beaten by a knockout in thirteen rounds.

His record was 57 wins and 5 losses, with 32 wins by knockout.

Professional boxing record

Crime, commuted sentence and death 

On November 27, 1980, in what became a famous case in Puerto Rico, after having injected himself with cocaine, de Jesús was involved in a traffic dispute with 17-year-old Roberto Cintron Gonzalez, which ended in de Jesús fatally shooting Gonzalez in the head. De Jesús was sentenced to life in prison. There, he excelled in another sport, baseball, making the Puerto Rico penal system all star team three times. In 1984, he became a born-again Christian and started to turn his life around, becoming a preacher.

In 1985, he learned that his brother Enrique, with whom he had shared needles, had died of AIDS. De Jesús tested positive for the virus, and symptoms began to appear. After it became public knowledge that de Jesús had acquired HIV and had become a sufferer of AIDS, governor Rafael Hernández Colón commuted his sentence.

After returning to spend his last days with his family, de Jesús was visited by many celebrities, including hall of fame baseball player Orlando Cepeda, Salsa music superstar Cheo Feliciano and his old nemesis Roberto Durán. Durán hugged and kissed de Jesús and told his daughter to do the same. This event was witnessed by José Torres who said he was amazed to see Durán's compassionate gesture as he lifted de Jesús out of his bed and hugged him at a time when so little was known and so much feared about AIDS.

Esteban de Jesús died one month after being released, at the age of 38.

See also 

 List of Puerto Ricans
 List of lightweight boxing champions
 List of WBC world champions
 List of Puerto Rican boxing world champions

References

External links 
 

1951 births
1989 deaths
People from Carolina, Puerto Rico
World boxing champions
AIDS-related deaths in Puerto Rico
Puerto Rican prisoners sentenced to life imprisonment
Prisoners sentenced to life imprisonment by Puerto Rico
People convicted of murder by Puerto Rico
Puerto Rican people convicted of murder
Puerto Rican male boxers
Lightweight boxers
Sportspeople convicted of murder
20th-century Puerto Rican people